The 4th European Women's Artistic Gymnastics Championships were held in Paris. These were the first European Championships to be held in a non-Eastern Bloc country. Out of concerns that East Germany would be excluded, the competition was boycotted by Bulgaria, Czechoslovakia, Hungary, Poland, Romania, and the Soviet Union.

Medalists  
All three medaling countries won their first European Championship medals at this competition.

Results

All-around

Vault

Uneven bars

Balance beam

Floor

References 

1963
International gymnastics competitions hosted by France
1963 in French sport
Euro